Michael Glen Block (born May 25, 1982) is an American cellist, singer, composer, and arranger.

Career
Block has worked with Yo-Yo Ma, Bobby McFerrin, Lenny Kravitz, Shakira, The National, Joe Zawinul, Alison Krauss, Rachel Barton Pine, and Mark O'Connor. Block plays with the Silk Road Ensemble. In January, 2014, Block married fiddler and composer Hanneke Cassel. He attended Cleveland Institute of Music (B.M. 2004) and The Juilliard School. He has played second cello alongside Yo-Yo Ma. He also performed in Mark O'Connor's Appalachia Waltz trio for three years. Block has served as musical director for Yo-Yo Ma, Bobby McFerrin, Lil' Buck, Bill Irwin, Marcus Printup, The Silk Road Ensemble, and The Knights.

Camps and teaching
In 2009 he founded the Mike Block String Camp in Vero Beach, Florida. Teachers provide instruction in multiple traditions, develop improvisational skills, and coach student bands to prepare for  performances. In 2012 Block started the Brooklyn Pop String Camp in New York City to nurture children's passion for playing music. In 2012, Block was appointed Associate Professor of Music at the Berklee College of Music in Boston. He has presented at Stanford University, Princeton University, Harvard University, New York University, Berklee College of Music, Cleveland Institute of Music, New England Conservatory, Belmont University, Southern Methodist University, Sam Houston State University, Illinois State University, Illinois Wesleyan University, and University of Arkansas. In 2006, he received Suzuki method certification in music education from the New York City-based School for Strings, under Pamela Devenport. From 2009 to 2012, he was the Lead Teaching Artist for Silk Road Connect, a partnership between the Silk Road Project and schools in New York City and Boston. In 2015 he began teaching cello online through the ArtistWorks music education website.

Other work
From 2011–2012, he was the Artistic Director and host of GALA Brooklyn: "Global Art - Local Art:", a Music Festival in Brooklyn. Block started the Vero Beach International Music Festival in 2014, which features performances by students and faculty of the Mike Block String Camp. He has appeared on Late Night with Conan O'Brien, National Public Radio's St. Paul Sunday, Regis and Kelly, VH1, the Disney Channel, WNBC-TV with Chuck Scarborough, and the CBS Early Show. He worked with director Yaron Zilberman as a music consultant for A Late Quartet, a 2011 movie starring Philip Seymour Hoffman and Christopher Walken.

Collaborations
 Duo with Darol Anger, fiddler
 Duo with Hanneke Cassel, Celtic fiddler
 Duo with Sandeep Das, Indian tabla player
 Duo with Balla Kouyate, balafon player from Mali
 Duo with Rachel Barton Pine, classical violinist
 Duo with Clay Ross, guitarist and singer
 Duo with Yang Wei, Chinese pipa player
 Duo with Derek Gripper, South African guitarist

Personal life

Block was struck by a Manhattan taxi in 2009, with injuries that required multiple surgeries.

He currently lives in Boston with his wife and young daughter.

Discography
 Words R Words (2009)
 After the Factory Closes (2010)
 Naïve Melody (2011)
 Brick by Brick (2012)
 It's Time to Dance (2019)
 Walls of Time (2019)
 Step into the Void: The Complete Bach Cello Suites (2020)

With Rez Abbasi
Things to Come (Sunnyside, 2009)

References

Sources
 
 
 
 
 
 
 
 - review of cello concerto

External links 
 Official site

1982 births
Living people
American classical cellists
Contemporary classical music performers
Juilliard School alumni
21st-century classical composers
Jazz cellists
American bluegrass cellists
Musicians from New York City
American bluegrass fiddlers
21st-century American musicians
Male classical composers
Country musicians from New York (state)
Classical musicians from New York (state)
21st-century American male musicians
American male jazz musicians
21st-century cellists